Marathyssa is a genus of moths of the family Euteliidae. The genus was erected by Francis Walker in 1865.

Species
Marathyssa albidisca (Hampson, 1905) South Africa, Zimbabwe
Marathyssa angustipennis (Schaus, 1906) Brazil (São Paulo)
Marathyssa basalis Walker, 1865 New York, Massachusetts
Marathyssa chacoensis Barbut & Lalanne-Cassou, 2011 Bolivia
Marathyssa cistellarix (Wallengren, 1860) South Africa
Marathyssa cuneades Draudt, 1950
Marathyssa cuneata (Saalmüller, 1891) Sierra Leone, Mauritania, Burkina Faso, the Gambia, Ghana, Nigeria, Cameroon, Zaire, Sudan, Saudi Arabia, Eritrea, Uganda, Kenya, Malawi, Tanzania, Zambia, Zimbabwe, South Africa, Namibia, Madagascar
Marathyssa harmonica (Hampson, 1898) Sikkim, southern India
Marathyssa inficita (Walker, 1865) New York to Texas
Marathyssa minus Dyar, 1921 Texas, Arizona

References

Euteliinae